Magic hat or Magic Hat may refer to:

 Magic Hat Brewing Company, a brewery located in South Burlington, Vermont

Books
 The Hat (book), a 1970 children's book
The Magic Hat, a 2002 picture book by Mem Fox and Tricia Tusa

Film and television
 Harriet's Magic Hats, a Canadian television series
 Magical Hat, a Japanese anime television series
 The Magic Top Hat, a 1932 German comedy film
 Willoughby's Magic Hat, a 1943 Phantasies animated short subject

Hats
 Hat-trick (magic trick), a classic magic trick where a performer will produce an object out of an apparently empty top hat
 Witch hat, a style of hat worn by witches in popular culture depictions, characterized by a conical crown and a wide brim

See also
 Sorcerer's Hat, a structure and the thematic icon of Disney's Hollywood Studios, the third of four theme parks built at the Walt Disney World Resort